Frank Sheldon Anthony (13 December 1891 – 13 January 1927) was a New Zealand seaman, farmer, short-story writer and novelist. He was born in Matawhero, East Coast, New Zealand, on 13 December 1891.

References

1891 births
1927 deaths
New Zealand farmers
20th-century New Zealand novelists
New Zealand sailors
20th-century New Zealand short story writers